Chenar (also Romanized as Chenār) is a village in Angut-e Sharqi Rural District, Anguti District, Germi County, Ardabil Province, Iran. At the 2006 census, its population was 186, in 39 families.

References 

Towns and villages in Germi County